Brenton Terrell (born 26 July 1961) is an Australian rower. He became silver medalist in the 1986 commonwealth games in the men's double sculls with Paul Reedy, competed in the men's quadruple sculls event at the 1988 Summer Olympics and is one of only three South Australians to win the Australian men's single sculling championship - The President's cup - 1988. He is The McVilly-Pearce Pin recipient number 357.

Coaching
Since his retirement from rowing, Brenton has coached many crews. Notable coaching achievements include:

 2007 Australian U23 women's Quad Scull - World Championships Silver medal
 2008 Australian U23 women's Quad Scull - World Championships Bronze medal
 2016 Oxford-Cambridge cup winning crew: Adelaide University Boat Club - Men's Eight - Gold medal

References

External links
 

1961 births
Living people
Australian male rowers
Olympic rowers of Australia
Rowers at the 1988 Summer Olympics
Rowers from Adelaide
Commonwealth Games medallists in rowing
Rowers at the 1986 Commonwealth Games
Commonwealth Games silver medallists for Australia
Medallists at the 1986 Commonwealth Games
20th-century Australian people